The 1990 Cal State Fullerton Titans football team represented California State University, Fullerton as a member of the Big West Conference during the 1990 NCAA Division I-A football season. Led by 11th-year head coach Gene Murphy, Cal State Fullerton compiled an overall record of 1–11 with a mark of 0–7 in conference play, placing last out of eight teams in the Big West. This was the worst record posted by the Titans in the 23 years they fielded an intercollegiate football team (1970–1992). The team their home games at Santa Ana Stadium in Santa Ana, California.

Schedule

Team players in the NFL
The following Cal State Fullerton Titans were selected in the 1991 NFL Draft.

References

Cal State Fullerton
Cal State Fullerton Titans football seasons
Cal State Fullerton Titans football